Blue Anchor is a hamlet in mid Cornwall, England, United Kingdom. It is in the civil parish of St Enoder It is situated on the old course of the A30 road (now re-routed south of the settlement as a dual carriageway bypass) between the villages of Fraddon and Penhale.

The Blue Anchor Inn is alleged to have been the first stop the King's Messenger made on his journey to announce the victory at the Battle of Trafalgar in October 1805.

References

External links

Hamlets in Cornwall